Big League was the official magazine of the National Rugby League. Its predecessor, The Rugby League News, was first published in 1920; in 1974 it was rebranded as Big League. In 2020, due to the effects of the COVID-19 pandemic in Australia and the initial suspension of the 2020 NRL season, production of the magazine was suspended and has not resumed; leaving the game without an official program.

The magazine served as a game-day program, containing team line-ups, stats and feature stories. It went on sale every Thursday at newsagents and exclusively at all active NRL grounds on weekends. Since 2005 it had been published by News Magazines; previously it was published by Text Magazines and Pacific Magazines.

The editor of the magazine was Maria Tsialis and the sub-editor was David Piepers. Senior writer was Pamela Whaley and staff writers were Michael Blok and Ben Lonergan. Craig Loughlin-Smith was the art director, who had been with the title since 1999.

Along with the 30 weekly issues of the magazine, Big League also offered the following publications: A5-sized Season Guide, Season Preview, 100-page Grand Final Souvenir, Year In Review issue, State of Origin and Test souvenir programs and the Official Rugby League Annual, compiled by rugby league historian David Middleton.

See also
Rugby League Review
Rugby League Week

References

External links

1920 establishments in Australia
Sports magazines published in Australia
Weekly magazines published in Australia
Magazines established in 1920
Magazines published in Sydney
News Corp Australia
National Rugby League
Rugby football magazines
Rugby league mass media